Buspirone/testosterone (tentative brand name Lybridos) is a combination of buspirone, a 5-HT1A receptor partial agonist, α2-adrenergic receptor antagonist, and D2 autoreceptor antagonist, and testosterone, an androgen or androgen receptor agonist, which is under development by the pharmaceutical company Emotional Brain for the treatment of female sexual dysfunction. Both buspirone and testosterone have individually been found to be effective in the treatment of female sexual dysfunction in clinical studies, and so their combination could be anticipated to be even more effective. As of January 2016, the combination is in phase II clinical trials, with a phase III trial being planned in the United States and Europe.

See also
 List of investigational sexual dysfunction drugs
 Bremelanotide
 Flibanserin
 Intrinsa

References

External links
 Buspirone/testosterone - AdisInsight
 Female sexual disorders: Treatment options in the pipeline

5-HT1A agonists
Alpha-2 blockers
Androgens and anabolic steroids
Androstanes
Aphrodisiacs
Azapirones
D2 antagonists
Female sexual dysfunction drugs